Gorji Bayan (also Romanized as Gorjī Bayān; also known as Ghūrjī, Ghūrjī Bayan, and Gorjī) is a village in Gavrud Rural District, in the Central District of Sonqor County, Kermanshah Province, Iran. At the 2006 census, its population was 469, in 102 families.

References 

Populated places in Sonqor County